Robert Crompton may refer to:

Bob Crompton (1879–1941), English international footballer
Robert Crompton (politician) (1869–1958), lawyer and politician in Fiji